In thermodynamics, the excess chemical potential is defined as the difference between the chemical potential of a given species and that of an ideal gas under the same conditions (in particular, at the same pressure, temperature, and composition).
The chemical potential of a particle species  is therefore given by an ideal part and an excess part.

Chemical potential of a pure fluid can be estimated by the Widom insertion method.

Derivation and Measurement
For a system of diameter  and volume , at constant temperature , the classical canonical partition function  

with  a scaled coordinate, the free energy is given by:

Combining the above equation with the definition of chemical potential,

we get the chemical potential of a sufficiently large system from (and the fact that the smallest allowed change in the particle number is )

wherein the chemical potential of an ideal gas can be evaluated analytically. 
Now let's focus on  since the potential energy of an  system can be separated into the potential energy of an  system and the potential of the excess particle interacting with the  system, that is,

and

Thus far we converted the excess chemical potential into an ensemble average, and the integral in the above equation can be sampled by the brute force Monte Carlo method.

The calculating of excess chemical potential is not limited to homogeneous systems, but has also been extended to inhomogeneous systems by the Widom insertion method, or other ensembles such as NPT and NVE.

See also
Apparent molar property

References
 Note: the equations and presentation in this article are drawn from Excess Chemical Potential via the Widom Method

Potentials
Thermodynamics
Chemical thermodynamics

ro:Mărimi molare de exces